The name Queenie has been used for four tropical cyclones in Western Pacific Ocean.

Named by the United States Armed Services:
 Typhoon Queenie (1945)

Named by PAGASA in the Philippines:
 Typhoon Chebi (2006) (T0620, 23W, Queenie) – struck the northern Philippines
 Tropical Storm Sinlaku (2014) (T1421, 22W, Queenie) – struck Philippines and Vietnam
 Typhoon Kong-rey (2018) (T1825, 30W, Queenie) – traversed the Ryukyu Islands before making landfall in South Korea
 Tropical Storm Banyan (2022) (T2223, 27W, Queenie) – remained out at sea.

Pacific typhoon set index articles